Allium melananthum, called ajo oscuro (dark garlic), ajo negro (black garlic) or ajo de flor negra (black-flowered garlic), is a species of wild garlic native to southeast coastal areas of Spain. It is similar to three other species of Allium of the western Mediterranean; A. pruinatum, A. sphaerocephalon and  A. ebusitanum, but can be distinguished from them by its dark purple to blackish-purple tepals, and its exerted stamens.

References

melananthum
Endemic flora of Spain
Endemic flora of the Iberian Peninsula
Plants described in 1895